The 2022 Troy Trojans football team represented Troy University as a member of the West Division of the Sun Belt Conference during the 2022 NCAA Division I FBS football season. Led by first-year head coach Jon Sumrall, the Trojans played home games at Veterans Memorial Stadium in Troy, Alabama.

Linebacker Carlton Martial began the 2022 season needing 104 tackles to break the all-time NCAA Division I FBS record for most tackles in a career. On November 12, 2022, he recorded his 546th tackle to break the prior record of 545 tackles set by Tim McGarigle of Northwestern.

Previous season

Schedule

Preseason

Recruiting class

|}

Sun Belt coaches poll
The Sun Belt coaches poll was released on July 25, 2022. The Trojans were picked to finish third in the West Division.

Sun Belt Preseason All-Conference teams

Offense

1st team
Austin Stidham – Offensive Lineman, SR
Tez Johnson – Wide Receiver, SO

Defense

1st team
Javon Solomon – Defensive Lineman, SO
Will Choloh – Defensive Lineman, SR
Carlton Martial – Linebacker, SR

2nd team
Richard Jibunor – Defensive Lineman, JR
TJ Harris – Defensive Back, SR

Personnel

Game summaries

at No. 21 Ole Miss

Alabama A&M

at Appalachian State

Marshall

at Western Kentucky

Southern Miss

Texas State

at South Alabama

at Louisiana

Army

Louisiana-Monroe

at Arkansas State

Coastal Carolina (SBC Championship)

vs. No 25 UTSA (Cure Bowl)

Rankings

References

Troy
Troy Trojans football seasons
Sun Belt Conference football champion seasons
Troy football team
Cure Bowl champion seasons